The post of Mayor of the City of New Orleans has been held by the following individuals since New Orleans came under American administration following the Louisiana Purchase — the acquisition by the U.S. of  of the French province La Louisiane in 1803. In mayoral elections since 1930, New Orleans has used a two-round system with a preliminary round and a runoff if no candidate reached a majority in the first round.

List
All mayors of New Orleans since 1872 have been Democrats.

Acting military mayors during the Civil War and Reconstruction
The following are the Union Army-appointed acting military mayors that served during the military's occupation of the city during the American Civil War and the Reconstruction era:

See also
 New Orleans mayoral elections
 Timeline of New Orleans

References

 
 

 
New Orleans
mayors
History of New Orleans